Spain is one of the first countries to deploy large-scale solar photovoltaics, and is the world leader in concentrated solar power (CSP) production.

In 2018, the cumulative total solar power installed was 7,011 MW, of which 4,707 MW were solar PV installations and 2,300 MW were concentrated solar power.

In 2016, nearly 8 TWh of electrical power was produced from photovoltaics, and 5 TWh from CSP plants. Throughout 2016, photovoltaics accounted for 3% of total electricity generation, and solar-thermal an additional 1.9%.

Spain is one of the European countries with the most hours of sunshine. 

The country initially had a leading role in the development of solar power. Generous prices for grid connected solar power were offered to encourage the industry. The boom in solar power installations were faster than anticipated and prices for grid connected solar power were not cut to reflect this, leading to a fast but unsustainable boom in installations. Spain would find itself second only to Germany in the world for solar power installed capacity. In the wake of the 2008 financial crisis, the Spanish government drastically cut its subsidies for solar power and capped future increases in capacity at 500 MW per year, with effects upon the industry worldwide. 
Between 2012 and 2016, new installations stagnated in Spain while growth accelerated in other leading countries leaving Spain to lose much of its world leading status to countries such as Germany, China and Japan. The controversial "sun tax" and intimidating regulation surrounding solar self consumption introduced in 2015 were only begun to be repealed in late 2018 by the new government.

As a legacy from Spain's earlier development of solar power, the country remains a world leader in concentrated solar power, accounting for almost a third of solar power installed capacity in the country, a much higher ratio than that for other countries as of 2017. Many large concentrated solar power stations remain active in Spain and may have provided some of the impetus for large CSP developments in neighbouring Morocco. In 2017 Spain held large auctions for renewable energy capacity to be constructed by 2020: PV and wind projects each won 4 GW.

2020 is likely to see the industry beginning a dramatic rebirth following Spain's National Energy and Climate Program (Plan Nacional Integrado de Energía y Clima – PNIEC). Up to 5 GW of new CSP installed capacity may be added.

Installed capacity 

Installed capacity grew rapidly until 2013. Since 2013 growth has been negligible in Spain, and the country has fallen behind many other European countries in the development of capacity, though it retains its leading position in the deployment of solar thermal power.

Timeline of developments

2004
Through a ministerial ruling in March 2004, the Spanish government removed economic barriers to the connection of renewable energy technologies to the electricity grid. The Royal Decree 436/2004 equalised conditions for large-scale solar thermal and photovoltaic plants and guaranteed feed-in tariffs.

2008
Spain added a record 2.6 GW of solar photovoltaic power in 2008, a figure almost five times that of the next record year, increasing capacity to 3.5 GW. Spain surpassed both Japan and the United States in 2008 as the number two market as measured by cumulative installed PV capacity behind the world leader at the time Germany, accounting for 24% of global PV capacity. PV capacity added during 2008 would still account for more than half of total capacity as of 2016. In 2008 the Spanish government committed to achieving a target of 12% of primary energy from renewable energy by 2010 and by 2020 expected the installed solar generating capacity of 10 GW.

2010–2011
Since 2010, Spain has been the world's leader in concentrated solar power (CSP). Spain is leapfrogged by Italy during 2011 following a later solar boom there to lose its position as the world's second largest installer of solar PV.

2012
By the end of 2012, 4.5 GW of solar photovoltaics had been installed, and in that year 8.2 TWh of electricity was produced. New installations of solar photovoltaics have slowed down significantly to around 300 MW during 2012. By the end of 2012 Spain had also installed over 2,000 MW of CSP.

2014–2016
Almost no new solar capacity is added during this period following the removal of government feed-in tariffs. Having promoted the solar industry with large government subsidies during earlier periods, the system now operates under a 180-degree turn with a punitive 'sun tax' applied to new PV systems which would otherwise flourish. Spain has been cited as a model in how not to develop renewables. The hoped for growth in self consumption solar generation during 2016 fails to materialise due to delays to reforms following the extended time taken to form a government, albeit with just one party opposed to reforms in this area.

2017
In May 2017, Spain held an auction for new renewable capacity to be online by 2020. Solar projects won only 1 MW of the 3000 MW awarded. After complaints by the solar industry which felt the auction terms favoured wind power, another auction occurred in July. In this auction, solar projects received 3,909 MW and wind received 1,128 MW. Financing, land acquisition and solar panel price fluctuations could reduce the actual amount of solar power installed.

2018
A new sector of the market begins to make headway in the Spanish market following the easing of regulations on self consumption generation. 261.7 MW of new solar power was installed, of which just 26 MW were connected to the grid and the remainder, 235.7 MW being self-generating installations. It is expected that this could increase to 300 to 400 MW per year following further easing of regulations in May 2018. Renewable energy auctions held in the previous year have yet to show much impact on grid connected capacity but expected to make a considerable change during 2019. According to industry sources the 3.9 GW tendered through government auctions has been dwarfed by huge merchant and power purchase agreements bringing the combined total under consideration to 29 GW. The re-emerging boom in Spanish solar PV is not being driven by subsidies or government tenders but as a result of solar being a highly cost effective proposition for electricity needs.

Solar thermal power plants 

In March 2007, Europe's first commercial concentrating solar power tower plant was opened near the sunny Andalusian city of Seville. The 11 MW plant, known as the PS10 solar power tower, produces electricity with 624 large heliostats.  Each of these mirrors has a surface measuring 120 square meters (1,290 square feet) that concentrates the Sun's rays to the top of a 115-meter (377 feet) high tower where a solar receiver and a steam turbine are located. The turbine drives a generator, producing electricity.

The Andasol 1 solar power station is Europe's first parabolic trough commercial power plant (50 MWe), located near Guadix in the province of Granada, also in Andalusia (the plant is named after the region).  The Andasol 1 power plant went online in November 2008, and has a thermal storage system which absorbs part of the heat produced in the solar field during the day. This heat is then stored in a molten salt mixture and used to generate electricity during the night, or when the sky is overcast.

A 15 MWe solar-only power tower plant, the Solar Tres project, is in the hands of the Spanish company SENER, employing molten salt technologies for receiving and energy storage. Its 16-hour molten salt storage system will be able to deliver power around the clock. The Solar Tres project has received a €5 million grant from the EC's Fifth Framework Programme.

Solar thermal power plants designed for solar-only generation are well matched to summer noon peak loads in prosperous areas with significant cooling demands, such as Spain. Using thermal energy storage systems, solar thermal operating periods can even be extended to meet base-load needs.

Abengoa Solar began commercial operation of a 20-megawatt solar power tower plant near Seville in late April 2009. Called the PS20, the plant uses a field of 1,255 flat mirrors, or heliostats, to concentrate sunlight on a receiver mounted on a central tower. Water pumped up the tower and through the receiver boils into steam, which is then directed through a turbine to produce electricity. The new facility is located adjacent to one with half its capacity, called PS10, which was the world's first commercial solar power tower plant. According to Abengoa Solar, the new facility is exceeding its predicted power output.

Photovoltaics

Solar PV market segmentation  

Utility scale solar PV dominated the cumulative installed capacity in 2018 accounting for over 75% of the total in Spain although some sources would not define smaller sized installations as utility scale. Only 2% of Spain's installations in 2017 were in the size typical for residential rooftop solar. This is typically the situation in European countries which had a short-term generous feed in their tariff system with little attention to policy consistency and scale of installations. As of 2018, 19% of Europe's cumulative PV capacity was installed on residential rooftops, and about 30% on commercial roofs, while the industrial segment accounted for 17%, and the utility market for 34%.

Residential solar PV capacity 

According to a report on behalf of the European Commission Spain had just 49 MW of residential solar PV capacity with just 12,000 residential solar PV prosumers in the country representing only 0.1% of households as of 2015. The average size of residential solar PV installations in Spain moving forwards to 2030 is 3.94 kW. The technical potential for residential solar PV in Spain is estimated at 13,620 MW. The United Kingdom, a relative latecomer to Solar PV development, had 2,499 MW of residential solar PV installed as of 2015.

Large PV roofs  

At the time of opening, the General Motors facility at Figueruelas was the world's largest photovoltaic (PV) roof, consisting of 85,000 lightweight panels, thereby reducing annual carbon dioxide emissions by 6,700 tonnes per year. GM planned to install solar panels at eleven other plants across Europe.

Utility-scale systems 

Photovoltaics (PV) convert sunlight into electricity and many solar photovoltaic power stations have been built in Spain. As of November 2010, the largest PV power plants in Spain include the Olmedilla Photovoltaic Park (60 MW), Puertollano Photovoltaic Park (47.6 MW), Planta Solar La Magascona & La Magasquila (34.5 MW), Arnedo Solar Plant (34 MW), and Planta Solar Dulcinea (31.8 MW).

BP Solar begun constructing a new solar photovoltaic cell manufacturing plant at its European headquarters in Tres Cantos, Madrid. For phase one of the Madrid expansion, BP Solar aimed to expand its annual cell capacity from 55 MW to around 300 MW. Construction of this facility was underway, with the first manufacturing line expected to be fully operational in 2009. The new cell lines would use innovative screen-printing technology. By fully automating wafer handling, the manufacturing lines would be able to handle the very thinnest of wafers available and ensure the highest quality. Thin wafers are of particular importance since there has been a silicon shortage in recent years. However, after the new national law limiting installed power by year, in April 2009 BP Solar closed its factories.

Since the beginning of 2007, Aleo Solar AG has also been manufacturing high-quality solar modules for the Spanish market at its own factory in Santa Maria de Palautordera near Barcelona. In 2014 SITECNO S.A. took over this facility

Regional PV distribution

Policies, laws and incentives

New technical building code
In 2006, Spain implemented a regulatory instrument of national jurisdiction promulgated by the Royal Decree 314/2006 referred to as the technical building code (TBC or CTE in Spanish) to regulate the basic quality requirements of buildings and their respective installations concerning thermal and photovoltaic solar energy. It applies to new constructions as well as any modifications made on any existing building with the final goal to guarantee and promote the use of renewable sources of energy.

Concerning thermosolar energy, Spain was the first country in Europe to enforce the integration of solar thermal systems in new constructed or refurnished buildings to cover from 30 to 70% of the Domestic Hot Water (DHW) demand. Article 15.4 of the TBC states that "buildings with foreseen demand for hot water or the conditioning of a covered swimming pool, part of the thermal energy needs shall be covered by incorporating systems for the collection, storage and use of low temperature solar energy [...]".

In relation to Photovoltaic power, Article 15.5 requires the incorporation of "systems for the collection and transformation of solar energy into electric power by photovoltaic processes for proprietary use or supply to the network". This policy triggered the production of this type of renewable energy positioning Spain on top of the largest producers of photovoltaic electricity in the world by 2009.

Subsidy reductions
In the wake of the 2008 financial crisis, the Spanish government drastically cut its subsidies for solar power and capped future increases in capacity at 500 MW per year, with effects upon the industry worldwide. "The solar industry in 2009 has been undermined by [a] collapse in demand due to the decision by Spain", according to Henning Wicht, a solar-power analyst. 
In 2010, the Spanish government went further, retroactively cutting subsidies for existing solar projects, aiming to save several billion euro it owed. 
According to the Photovoltaic Industry Association, several hundred photovoltaic plant operators may face bankruptcy. 
Phil Dominy of Ernst & Young, comparing the feed-in tariff reductions in Germany and Italy, said; "Spain stands out as an example of how not to do it". 
As a result, a Spanish association of solar power producers has announced its intention to go to court over the government's plans to cap solar subsidies. In 2014 alternative energy group NextEra filed a complaint against Spain at the International Centre for Settlement of Investment Disputes.

Research and development
The Plataforma Solar de Almería (PSA), part of the Center for Energy, Environment and Technological Research (CIEMAT), is a center for research, development, and testing of concentrating solar power technologies. ISFOC in Puertollano is a development institute for concentrator photovoltaics (CPV) which evaluates CPV technologies at the pilot production scale to optimise operation and determine cost. Technical University of Madrid has a photovoltaic research group.

Solar Concentra is the Spanish technology platform for concentrated solar power (CSP). It was created in 2010, and it combines the efforts of the different agents of the CSP sector in Spain.

See also
 Growth of photovoltaics
 List of renewable energy topics by country
 Net metering
 Renewable energy in Spain
 Solar energy in the European Union

References

External links
Spain pioneers grid-connected solar-tower thermal power
Photovoltaic solar power grows fast in Spain
GM installs world's biggest rooftop solar panels
Is the Sun Setting on Solar Power in Spain?